The Penderyn television relay station is sited on high ground to the east of the village of Penderyn in the Brecon Beacons. It was originally built in 1984 as a fill-in relay for UHF analogue television covering the communities of Penderyn and Hirwaun. The transmissions are beamed west and south to cover all these targets. The Penderyn transmission station is owned and operated by Arqiva.

When it came, the digital switchover process for Penderyn duplicated the timing at Carmel with the first stage taking place on 26 August 2009 and with the second stage being completed on 23 September 2009. After the switchover process, analogue channels had ceased broadcasting permanently and the Freeview digital TV services were radiated at an ERP of 2.6 W each.

Channels listed by frequency

Analogue television

Spring 1984 - 26 August 2009
Penderyn entered service in spring 1984, and (being in Wales) transmitted the S4C variant of Channel 4.

Analogue and digital television

26 August 2009 - 23 September 2009
The UK's digital switchover commenced at Carmel (and therefore at Penderyn and all its other relays) on 26 August 2009. Analogue BBC Two Wales on channel 45 was first to close, and ITV Wales was moved from channel 49 to channel 45 for its last month of service. Channel 49 was replaced by the new digital BBC A mux which started up in 64-QAM and at full power (i.e. 2.6 W).

Digital television

23 September 2009 - present
The remaining analogue TV services were closed down and the digital multiplexes took over on the original analogue channels' frequencies.

References

External links
The Transmission Gallery: Penderyn 

Transmitter sites in Wales
Carmel UHF 625-line Transmitter Group